Ningen is "human being" in Japanese language. Ningen may refer to:

 Ningen (1962 film), a Japanese drama film
 Ningen (2013 film), a Japanese-Turkish drama film
 Ningen (folklore), a gigantic humanoid whale-like creature from modern Japanese folklore

See also
Ningen Isu, a Japanese heavy metal band